Third Avenue is a thoroughfare in Manhattan and the Bronx, in New York City.

Third Avenue or 3rd Avenue may also refer to:

Third Avenue (Brooklyn), a thoroughfare in Brooklyn, New York City
3rd Avenue (band), a Filipino band
Third Avenue (album), a 2019 album by Fredo
Third Avenue (2019), a Nigerian comedy film

See also 
 or 
 or 
Third Avenue Bridge (disambiguation)
Third Avenue (BMT Canarsie Line), a New York City Subway station in Manhattan; serving the  train
Third Avenue–138th Street (IRT Pelham Line), a New York City Subway station in the Bronx; serving the  trains
Third Avenue–149th Street (IRT White Plains Road Line), a New York City Subway station in the Bronx; serving the  trains
Third Avenue Railway, a former street railway company in Manhattan and the Bronx
IRT Third Avenue Line, a former elevated railway line in Manhattan and the Bronx
BMT Third Avenue Line, a former elevated railway line in Brooklyn
Third Avenue Line (Manhattan surface), a bus line
Third Avenue Historic District (disambiguation)
3rd Street (disambiguation)